The Revolutionary Left Front (abbreviated FRI) is a political party in Bolivia, founded in 1978.

Foundation
FRI was formed at a national conference of leftwing forces, held in La Paz April 23, 1978. The meeting was organized by an initiative committee (led by Dr. Guido Perales Aguilar as permanent secretary). The founding of FRI in April 1978 was a formalization of an already existing informal cooperation between different political groups. FRI was composed of the Communist Party of Bolivia (Marxist–Leninist) (PCB(ML)), Revolutionary Party of the Nationalist Left (PRIN), Revolutionary Party of the Workers of Bolivia (PRTB), POR-Combate, Vanguardia Comunista del POR (the latter two were Trotskyist groups) and an independent grouping led by Manuel Morales Dávila. POR-Masas was blocked from joining FRI. Óscar Zamora Medinaceli was the founding chairman of FRI, and politically FRI was under the control of PCB(ML). Lidia Gueiler Tejada was the vice president of FRI.

The declaration of principles of FRI reads that "FRI is the political instrument of the masses, which enables the accumulation of forces in order to defeat the dictatorship, impose democratic freedoms and achieve national liberation."

1978 and 1979 elections
The presidential candidate of FRI in the 1978 elections was Casiano Amurrio. Amurrio obtained 23,459 votes (1.2% of the national vote). In the parliamentary elections the FRI obtained the same result.

PRIN left FRI ahead of the 1979 elections, and joined UDP. Morales Dávila also broke away from FRI. FRI became little more than the public facade of PCB(ML), as other factions had deserted it. The group sought to merge with UDP, but failed.
In the 1979 elections FRI was part of a larger coalition, the Democratic Alliance (along with the Revolutionary Nationalist Movement, the Christian Democratic Party and Wálter Guevara's PRA). Lidia Gueiler was the vice-presidential candidate of the alliance.
The FRI won 5 seats.

Later period
In the parliamentary elections of 1980 and 1985, it ran in alliance with the conservative MNR winning each time three seats. In 1989 and 1993 elections, FRI was part of the Patriotic Accord (the electoral pact between Hugo Banzer's Nationalist Democratic Action and the Revolutionary Left Movement) winning four and two seats respectively. In 1997 it won one seat on a list of the MIR.

On October 6, 2018, Carlos de Mesa Gisbert announced on his YouTube channel, that he would run for president under the Revolutionary Left Front party, almost one year before the 2019 Bolivian general election. In the 2020 election, FRI once again supported Mesa and elected three Deputies, returning to Parliament.

Municipal and regional politics
During the 1990s, the intervention in municipal politics of the party was generally limited to the Tarija and Cochabamba departments. The FRI chairman Zamora Medinaceli was mayor of Tarija in 1987–1989, 1994–1996 and 1996–1997. In the 1991 municipal elections, the party got 20,179 votes (1.55% of the nationwide vote), whilst in the 1993 municipal election it obtained 25,099 votes (2.24%). In the 1991 municipal elections, the party had the highest percentage of female candidates in the major cities amongst all contesting parties (8 out of 36 candidates, 22.2%). In 1993 eleven out of 52 FRI candidates were women. In the 1995 municipal elections, the vote of the party reached 53,540 (3.12%). The party won 27 municipal council seats (out of 1585 in all of Bolivia). The party won 17 municipal council seats (out of a total of 1,700 in all of Bolivia) in the 1999 municipal elections.

References

1978 establishments in Bolivia
Political parties established in 1978
Political parties in Bolivia
Revolutionary Nationalist Movement breakaway groups
Social democratic parties in South America
Socialist parties in Bolivia